Sue-Ellen Cassiana "Suella" Braverman  (née Fernandes, born 3 April 1980) is a British politician and barrister who has served as Home Secretary since 25 October 2022. She previously held the position from 6 September to 19 October 2022 under Prime Minister Liz Truss. A member of the Conservative Party, she was chair of the European Research Group from 2017 to 2018 and attorney general for England and Wales from 2020 to 2022. She has been Member of Parliament (MP) for Fareham since 2015.

In the January 2018 cabinet reshuffle she was appointed parliamentary under-secretary of state for exiting the European Union by Prime Minister Theresa May. In November 2018 she resigned in protest against May's draft Brexit withdrawal agreement. Braverman was appointed attorney general for England and Wales and advocate general for Northern Ireland by Prime Minister Boris Johnson in the February 2020 cabinet reshuffle; she was appointed as Queen's Counsel automatically on her appointment.

Following Johnson’s announcing his resignation in July 2022, Braverman stood as a candidate to succeed him in the July–September Conservative Party leadership election but was eliminated from the ballot after the second round of voting. She subsequently supported Truss’s bid to become Conservative leader, and was appointed home secretary on 6 September when Truss became prime minister. Braverman resigned as home secretary on 19 October after she breached the Ministerial Code by sending sensitive information using her personal email address. Six days later, she was reinstated as home secretary by Truss's successor Rishi Sunak.

Early life and education
Braverman was born in Harrow, Greater London, and raised in Wembley. She is the daughter of Uma (née Mootien-Pillay) and Christie Fernandes, both of Indian origin, who emigrated to Britain in the 1960s from Mauritius and Kenya respectively. She is named after the character Sue Ellen Ewing from the American television soap opera Dallas which was popular at the time of her birth. Her mother, of Hindu Tamil Mauritian descent, was a nurse and a councillor in Brent, as well as the Conservative candidate in Tottenham in the 2001 general election and the 2003 Brent East by-election. Her father, of Goan ancestry (who formerly was an Indian in Kenya), worked for a housing association. She is the niece of Mahen Kundasamy, a former Mauritian High Commissioner to London.

She attended the Uxendon Manor Primary School in Brent and the fee-paying Heathfield School, Pinner, on a partial scholarship, after which she read law at Queens' College, Cambridge. During her undergraduate studies, she was president of the Cambridge University Conservative Association.

Braverman lived in France for two years, as an Erasmus Programme student and then as an Entente Cordiale Scholar, where she studied a master's degree in European and French law at Panthéon-Sorbonne University.

Career
Braverman was called to the bar at Middle Temple in 2005. She completed pupillage at 2–3 Gray's Inn Square (now Cornerstone Barristers) but did not start tenancy there, beginning practice at the London branch of a large Birmingham set, No5 Chambers. She worked in litigation including the judicial review "basics" for a government practitioner of immigration and planning law. She passed the New York bar exam in 2006 and was thereafter licensed to practise law in the state. That licence was suspended in 2021 after she did not re-register as an attorney. She was appointed to the Attorney General's C panel of counsel, the entry level, undertaking basic government cases, in 2010.

Conservative candidate
Braverman's name was already on the list of Conservative parliamentary candidates at the time of the 2003 Brent East by-election, and she had to be persuaded not to seek the nomination. Her mother, Uma Fernandes, a Conservative councillor, was selected to fight the seat, and Braverman campaigned for her. During the campaign, Braverman was featured in The Guardian in an article titled "The road to No 10".

At the 2005 general election, Braverman contested Leicester East, finishing in second place behind Labour's Keith Vaz, who won with a 15,876-vote (38.4%) majority. She sought selection as the Conservative candidate in Bexhill and Battle, but was unsuccessful, and was eventually selected to be the Conservative candidate in Fareham. Braverman also sought election to the London Assembly at the 2012 Assembly elections and was placed fourth on the Conservative London-wide list; only the first three Conservative candidates were elected.

Parliamentary activity
Braverman was elected to the House of Commons as the MP for Fareham in 2015 with 56.1% of the vote and a majority of 22,262. She gave her maiden speech on 1 June 2015. She has taken a particular interest in education, home affairs and justice and has written for The Daily Telegraph, Bright Blue,  i News, HuffPost, Brexit Central and ConservativeHome.

From 2015 to 2017, Braverman was a member of the Education Select Committee and the Education, Skills and the Economy Sub-Committee. Between November 2015 and February 2016, she was a member of the Joint Committee on the Draft Investigatory Powers Bill. Braverman chaired the all-party parliamentary group (APPG) on Financial Education for Young People from September 2016 to May 2017. Working with the charity Young Enterprise and the "money-saving expert" journalist Martin Lewis, she led the APPG's inquiry into the provision of financial education in schools and launched its report, Financial Education in Schools: Two Years On – Job Done?, which called for better financial education in schools. Braverman was also a commissioner on the Social Market Foundation Commission on Inequality in Education, a cross-party initiative examining the causes and effects of inequality in education at primary and secondary levels in England and Wales.

Braverman joined the Armed Forces Parliamentary Scheme in 2016, graduating from the scheme in 2017. Braverman opened a Westminster Hall debate in the House of Commons on the failings of Southern Health NHS Foundation Trust and has chaired meetings with the Trust's executives along with other MPs on the All-Party Parliamentary Group for Hampshire in which instances of poor care quality and the deaths of patients were investigated.

Braverman was a member of the panel of an inquiry, led by the think-tank British Future, to examine how the government could protect the rights of EU citizens in the UK. Braverman campaigned to leave the European Union in the 2016 EU membership referendum; a majority (55%) of votes in her constituency were for leaving. She was chair of the European Research Group, a pro-Leave group of Conservative MPs, until her promotion to ministerial office; she was replaced by Jacob Rees-Mogg. Following the 2017 general election, Braverman was appointed parliamentary private secretary to the ministers of the Treasury.

During the January 2018 reshuffle, Braverman was appointed as parliamentary under-secretary of state at the Department for Exiting the European Union. On 15 November 2018, Braverman resigned on the same day that Davis' successor, Dominic Raab, resigned as Brexit secretary in protest at Theresa May and Olly Robbins's draft Brexit deal, which was released the day before.

In March 2019, Braverman stated in a speech for the Bruges Group that "[a]s Conservatives, we are engaged in a battle against Cultural Marxism". Journalist Dawn Foster challenged Braverman's use of the term "cultural Marxism", highlighting its anti-Semitic history and stating it was a theory in the manifesto of the mass murderer Anders Breivik. Braverman's use of the term was initially condemned as hate speech by other MPs, the Board of Deputies of British Jews and the anti-racist organisation Hope Not Hate, among other anti-racist charities. Braverman denied that the term was an antisemitic trope, saying, "We have culture evolving from the far left which has allowed the snuffing out of freedom of speech, freedom of thought. ... I'm very aware of that ongoing creep of cultural Marxism, which has come from Jeremy Corbyn." After meeting with her later, the Board of Deputies of British Jews said in a subsequent statement that she is "not in any way antisemitic", saying it believed that she did not "intentionally use antisemitic language", while finding that she "is clearly a good friend of the Jewish community" and that they were "sorry to see that the whole matter has caused distress".

Attorney general

In the 13 February 2020 reshuffle, Braverman was appointed attorney general for England and Wales and advocate general for Northern Ireland, succeeding Geoffrey Cox who had been dismissed from government. Braverman was made QC at the time of this appointment. She was later criticised by members of the Bar Council for her poor choices in the role.

Braverman was designated as a minister on leave while pregnant on 2 March 2021, shortly after the Ministerial and other Maternity Allowances Act 2021 was enacted to allow this arrangement. Michael Ellis became acting attorney general until she resumed office on 11 September 2021.

Leadership candidate 

During the July 2022 United Kingdom government crisis, Braverman remained a minister, though on 6 July 2022, she called for Boris Johnson to resign. She stood in the ensuing Conservative Party leadership election, but was eliminated from the race in the second round of ballots, winning 27 votes, a reduction on her vote in the first round and the lowest of the remaining candidates. She then endorsed Liz Truss.

Had she succeeded in being appointed prime minister, Braverman said her priorities would have been to deliver tax cuts, cut government spending, tackle the cost of living challenges, "solve the problem of boats crossing the Channel", deliver "Brexit opportunities", withdraw the UK from the European Convention of Human Rights and to "get rid of all of this woke rubbish". She also vowed to suspend the UK's target of net zero carbon emissions by 2050. In August 2022, The Guardian reported that Braverman's leadership campaign had received a £10,000 donation from a company owned by the climate change denier Terence Mordaunt.

Home secretary

First term (2022) 
Braverman was appointed Home Secretary in the new Truss ministry on 6 September 2022.

In October 2022, Braverman said that she would love to see a front page of The Daily Telegraph sending asylum seekers to Rwanda and described it as her "dream" and "obsession". The first attempted flight by the UK to send asylum seekers to Rwanda in June 2022 resulted in asylum seekers being restrained and attached to plane seats after self-harming and threatening suicide. On the matter, the UN Refugee Agency have said that the "arrangement, which amongst other concerns seeks to shift responsibility and lacks necessary safeguards, is incompatible with the letter and spirit of the 1951 Convention" in regards to the rights of refugees. Later Amber Rudd, a former Conservative Home Secretary, criticised the plans to send some asylum seekers to Rwanda as "brutal" and "impractical".

Braverman left her cabinet position as Home Secretary on 19 October 2022. She said that her departure was because she had made an "honest mistake" by sharing an official document from her personal email address with a colleague in Parliament, an action which breached the Ministerial Code. Braverman was also highly critical of Truss's leadership in her resignation letter.

Second term (2022–present) 
On 25 October, Braverman was reappointed as the home secretary by the prime minister Rishi Sunak upon the formation of the Sunak ministry. Braverman's reappointment was challenged by Labour Party MPs, Liberal Democrats, Scottish National Party MPs and some Conservatives. The Labour leader and Leader of the Opposition, Keir Starmer, raised it as the subject of his first question to Rishi Sunak at Sunak's first Prime Minister's questions on 26 October 2022. Sunak said Braverman "made an error of judgment but she recognised that she raised the matter and she accepted her mistake". Jake Berry, who was dismissed by Sunak after becoming PM, said that "from my own knowledge, there were multiple breaches of the ministerial code".

There are demands by Labour and the Liberal Democrats, as well as Conservative MP Caroline Nokes, for an inquiry into Braverman's return to the cabinet despite the alleged security breach. The government announced there will not be an inquiry into Braverman.  The Public Administration and Constitutional Affairs Select Committee was strongly critical of the decision to reappoint Braverman.  The committee stated reappointing Braverman  created a dangerous precedent. Leaking restricted material "is worthy of significant sanction under the new graduated sanctions regime (...) including resignation and a significant period out of office."  The committee also stated a later change in prime minister should not allow a minister to return to office in a shorter period.  "To allow this (...) does not inspire confidence in the integrity of government nor offer much incentive to proper conduct in future."

In March 2023, she visited Rwanda and viewed housing which might be used by asylum seekers. 

In April she faces a reselection vote for the next general election. Under the 2023 Periodic Review of Westminster constituencies, her Fareham constituency is set to be dissolved and merged with Meon Valley to form "Fareham and Waterlooville". Her rival in the selection process is Meon Valley MP Flick Drummond.

Political and legal positions
Braverman stands on the right wing of the Conservative Party, was a supporter of Brexit, supports the withdrawal of the UK from the European Convention on Human Rights and supports sending cross-Channel migrants to Rwanda. She has said, "If I get trolled and I provoke a bad response on Twitter I know I'm doing the right thing. Twitter is a sewer of left-wing bile. The extreme left pile on is often a consequence of sound conservative values."

Legacy of the British Empire
Braverman has described herself as a "child of the British Empire". Her parents, who were from Mauritius and Kenya, came to the UK "with an admiration and gratitude for what Britain did for Mauritius and Kenya, and India". She believes that on the whole, "the British Empire was a force for good", and described herself as being "proud of the British Empire".

Free schools
Braverman was the founding chair of governors at the Michaela Community School, and supports plans to create a free school in Fareham. She sits on the advisory board of the New Schools Network, a charity which aims to support groups setting up free schools within the English state education sector.

Rights versus responsibilities
In a December 2015 op-ed, Braverman wrote, "In essence, rights have come to fill the space once occupied by generosity." She quoted Eric Posner's theories on what the Brazilian state sees as its right to use torture by "the police in the name of crime prevention. They justify this by putting a general right to live free from crime and intimidation above their rights of those who are tortured." She closed,

Transgender rights
In an interview with The Times, Braverman said that schools do not have to accommodate requests from students who wish to change how others recognise their gender, including the use of the pronouns, uniforms, lavatories and changing facilities of their identified gender if it differs from their sex. She argued that, legally, under-18s are entitled to be treated only by the gender corresponding to their sex and that the "unquestioning approach" adopted by some teachers and schools is the reason different parts of the country have very different rates of children presenting as transgender.

India trade deal
Braverman, who is of Indian heritage, said that she feared a trade deal with India would increase migration to the UK when Indians already represented the largest group of people who overstayed their visa.

Immigration 
In 2022, as Home Secretary, Braverman referred to people reaching the UK by crossing the Channel in small boats as an 'invasion'. Braverman's comments attracted criticism from an 83-year-old Holocaust survivor who in January 2023 accused Braverman of using language akin to Nazi rhetoric. Braverman stood by her comments and declined to apologise, stating: "We have a problem with people exploiting our generosity, breaking our laws and undermining our system."

Legal contribution accusations
Braverman's details on the No5 Chambers website said that she "is a contributor to Philip Kolvin QC's book Gambling for Local Authorities, Licensing, Planning and Regeneration". The Observer had questioned this in 2020 and, in October 2022, The Big Issue reported Kolvin saying that she "did not make a written or editorial contribution to the book", but simply "on one occasion I asked her to do some photocopying for the book". Braverman's parliamentary office, the Home Office and No5 Chambers all declined to comment, but the claim was removed from the website after The Big Issue had enquired. "The Secret Barrister" told The Big Issue, "For a practising barrister to include on a chambers profile something which is not merely an exaggeration but knowing false, is the type of dishonest conduct that should rightly attract the attention of the Bar Standards Board." It was later reported by Private Eye that the Bar Standards Board was investigating a complaint that she had made a "dishonest statement out of self-interest to promote her career".

The Eye also reported that her MP's website had said that she was involved "in the lengthy Guantanamo Bay Inquiry into the treatment of detainees by US and UK forces", although her name does not appear in the inquiry report, and suggested she may merely have been one of scores of lawyers who had sifted through documents.

Personal life 
She married Rael Braverman, a manager of the Mercedes-Benz Group, in February 2018 at the House of Commons. Speaking to a meeting of the Asian-Jewish Business Network in 2021, Braverman described her husband as a "very proud member of the Jewish community" and stated his family are contributors to the Bushey synagogue. They have two children, born in 2019 and 2021.

Braverman is a member of the Triratna Buddhist Community (formerly the Friends of the Western Buddhist Order) and attends the London Buddhist Centre monthly. She took her oath of office on the Dhammapada.

Honours
 She was sworn in as a member of Her Majesty's Most Honourable Privy Council on 19 February 2020 at Buckingham Palace. This gave her the honorific prefix "The Right Honourable".
 She was appointed as Queen's Counsel (QC) on 24 February 2020.

Notes

References

Notes

External links 

 Official website
 
 

|-

|-

|-

|-

|-

|-

|-

|-

|-

1980 births
21st-century English women politicians
Alumni of Queens' College, Cambridge
Alumni of the Erasmus Programme
British Eurosceptics
British people of Goan descent
British politicians of Indian descent
Conservative Party (UK) MPs for English constituencies
English Buddhists
English King's Counsel
English people of Indian descent
English people of Kenyan descent
English people of Mauritian descent
Female justice ministers
Female members of the Parliament of the United Kingdom for English constituencies
Friends of the Western Buddhist Order
Living people
UK MPs 2015–2017
UK MPs 2017–2019
UK MPs 2019–present
Secretaries of State for the Home Department
Women government ministers in the United Kingdom
Female members of the Cabinet of the United Kingdom
Members of the Privy Council of the United Kingdom
Attorneys General for England and Wales
Women Law Officers of the Crown in the United Kingdom
People from Harrow, London
People from Wembley
Members of the Middle Temple
British Buddhists
People educated at Heathfield School, Pinner
Right-wing_politics_in_the_United_Kingdom
21st-century King's Counsel